Scipio Township is one of the fifteen townships of Seneca County, Ohio, United States.  The 2010 census found 1,729 people in the township, 1,180 of whom lived in the unincorporated portions of the township.

Geography
Located in the east central part of the county, it borders the following townships:
Adams Township - north
Thompson Township - northeast corner
Reed Township - east
Venice Township - southeast corner
Bloom Township - south
Eden Township - southwest corner
Clinton Township - west
Pleasant Township - northwest corner

The village of Republic is located in central Scipio Township.

Name and history
Scipio Township was organized in 1824. It was named after Scipio, New York, the former hometown of many of its early settlers.
Statewide, the only other Scipio Township is located in Meigs County.

Government
The township is governed by a three-member board of trustees, who are elected in November of odd-numbered years to a four-year term beginning on the following January 1. Two are elected in the year after the presidential election and one is elected in the year before it. There is also an elected township fiscal officer, who serves a four-year term beginning on April 1 of the year after the election, which is held in November of the year before the presidential election. Vacancies in the fiscal officership or on the board of trustees are filled by the remaining trustees.

References

External links
County website

Townships in Seneca County, Ohio
Townships in Ohio